Tung Chung Road is a two disjointed-section road connecting the north and south coast of Lantau Island.

Description
The first section is a short road linking a former pier and Wong Nai Uk in Tung Chung. The second is a long and hilly section connecting Tung Chung in the island north to Cheung Sha in the island south. The two sections were previously connected until the completion of the replacement road, Chung Yan Road in Tung Chung New Town.

The short section is featured with historical Tung Chung Battery, a military coastal defence in Ming dynasty. It runs along the a river Ma Wan Chung and ends in Chung Yan Road.

The long section is a long, steep, narrow and winding road. Due to physical constraints, it was open only to buses, taxis and permit-bearing vehicles only and speed limit is set to 30 km/h. being too dangerous for double-decker buses to be trafficable and only "single-deckers" are used in the bus services. It starts near Ma Wan New Village and joins Chung Yan Road near a river before proceeding upwards to the valley between Sunset Peak and Lantau Peak. It reaches its highest point at a pass in Pak Kung Au (also known as Tung Chung Au) then follows a steep downhill route. The southern end joins South Lantau Road in Cheung Sha.

Because of its limited capacity, the Transport Department opened the road only to buses, taxis and holders of a permit, issued to residents and business of South Lantau.

The nature of Tung Chung Road helped preserve the rural landscape in southern Lantau. There are bus routes from Tung Chung to various destinations like Cheung Sha, Mui Wo, Shek Pik and Tai O in the island's south. The road splits off the Lantau Trail on the southern slope of the island.

History

New section
Prior to completion of the new section in 2009, numerous parts consisted of a single lane only; when two oncoming vehicles approached, one had to find a passing place to stop and let the other pass.

On 6 February 2009, the improved Tung Chung Road section between Lung Tseng Tau and Cheung Sha near San Shek Wan on Lantau Island was fully opened from 10am. The new road is a dual carriageway wide enough for two vehicles to pass each other and has fewer sharp turns. 

Following the opening, the old road section between Pak Kung Au and Cheung Sha near Cheung Sha Bridge has been closed. Vehicles are diverted to the new road section between Pak Kung Au and San Shek Wan.

Intersections

See also
 List of streets and roads in Hong Kong

References

Tung Chung
Roads in the New Territories
Lantau Island